Cell Metabolism is a monthly peer-reviewed scientific journal covering physiology, with an emphasis on understanding the molecular basis of how the body self-regulates in the face of change, and how disturbances in these balances can lead to disease. The journal was established in 2005 and is published by Cell Press. The editor-in-chief is Allyson Evans.

According to the Journal Citation Reports, the journal has a 2020 impact factor of 27.287, ranking it third out of 128 journals in the category "Endocrinology & Metabolism."

References

External links

Physiology journals
Cell Press academic journals
Publications established in 2005
Monthly journals
English-language journals